Jesse Robinson House was a historic home located at Seaford, Sussex County, Delaware, United States. It consisted of two sections: the rear wing, built about 1820 as a single-pile, one-room-plan frame house, and the front section, added about 1860 as a two-story single-pile, center-hall-plan frame structure.  Five bays in width and resting on a brick foundation, it had design elements that mixed the Greek Revival and Italianate styles.

It was added to the National Register of Historic Places in 1982.

References

Houses on the National Register of Historic Places in Delaware
Greek Revival houses in Delaware
Italianate architecture in Delaware
Houses completed in 1860
Houses in Sussex County, Delaware
Seaford, Delaware
National Register of Historic Places in Sussex County, Delaware